The Republika Srpska basketball team is the national basketball team of Republika Srpska, an entity part of Bosnia and Herzegovina. The team cannot play official matches in FIBA competitions. Many players represent the Bosnia and Herzegovina national basketball team instead.

History
Republic of Srpska Basketball Association (Serbian: Košarkaški savez Republike Srpske - KSRS) appeared in November 1992, after Republic of Srpska had been formed. During 1993, KSRS worked on organising what is now RS Basketball Championship. After the war on the BiH territory, KSRS integrated together with KSFBiH and KSHB into BiH Basketball Association. 
At the national level Republic of Srpska played friendly matches within a traditional manifestation called Basketball Tournament (Košarkaški sabor) where Republic of Srpska senior team played friendly matches against Serbian national team consisting of players from Serbian Top Division. During that tournament KSRS named the best male and female basketball players of the year.

Games played

Current status 
During the International Sport Fair in Belgrade in November 2014, the protocole of cooperation was signed by BF Serbia and BF Republic of Srpska. In 2015 the Serbian selection is going to play against the Republic of Srpska during preparations for 2015 FIBA European championship.

Competitive record

At Republic of Srpska Basketball Tournament

Roster
Team for the 2015 Kosarkaski Sabor Republike Srpske.

|}
| valign="top" |
Head coach

Assistant coach

|}

Past rosters

2014 Kosarkaski Sabor Republike Srpske:

4 Srdjan Lončar, 5 Djordje Aleksić, 6 Stefan Lakić, 7 Nemanja Stanimirović, 8 Vladimir Aleksic, 9 Željko Klještan, 10 Stefan Glogovac, 11 Djordje Nikolić, 12 Nikola Djurasovic, 13 Marko Josilo, 14 Dragan Djuranovic, 15 Dušan Ognjenović, 16 Igor Josipovic, 18 Obrad Tomic (Coach: Dragojlub Vidačić)

2013 Kosarkaski Sabor Republike Srpske:

4 Filip Adamovic, 5 Drasko kneyevic, 6 Vladimir Radovanovic, 7 Aleksandar Vasilic, 8 Vladimir Aleksic, 9 Dejan Sakotic, 10 Nemanja Gordic, 11 Milan Kezic, 12 Nikola Djurasovic, 13 Marko Josilo, 14 Dragan Djuranovic, 15 Goran Kovacevic, 16 Igor Josipovic, 17 Drasko Albijanic, 18 Obrad Tomic (Coach: Goran Sladojevic)

Youth competitions

At Tournament of Regions

References 

Sport in Republika Srpska
Basketball teams in Bosnia and Herzegovina